Bairia is a nagar panchayat in Bairia tehsil in Ballia District of Uttar Pradesh State, India. It belongs to Azamgarh Division. It is located 35 km to the east of the district headquarters Ballia. It is a block headquarters and tehsil headquarters.
Bairia is a nagar panchayat (he is divided in 16 ward)located in Bairia Tehsil of Ballia district , Uttar Pradesh with total 3904 families residing. The Bairia nagar panchayat has population of 28394 of which 14981 are males while 13413 are females as per Population Census 2011.

In Bairia nagar panchayat population of children with age 0-6 is 4641 which makes up 16.35 % of total population of nagar panchayat. Average Sex Ratio of Bairia nagar panchayat is 895 which is lower than Uttar Pradesh state average of 912. Child Sex Ratio for the Bairia as per census is 867, lower than Uttar Pradesh average of 902.

Bairia nagar panchayat has higher literacy rate compared to Uttar Pradesh. In 2011, literacy rate of Bairia nagar panchayat was 70.39 % compared to 67.68 % of Uttar Pradesh. In Bairia Male literacy stands at 81.07 % while female literacy rate was 58.54 %.
Bairia's Pin code is 277201 and postal head office is Bairia (Ballia).

Geography

Bairia nagar panchayat are 16 ward.

Bairia is surrounded by Murlichhapra Block, Chakki Block and Shahpur Block to the south, and Reoti Block to the west. Reoti, Revelganj, Behea, Chhapra are the nearby cities to Bairia.

Bairia is on the border of the Ballia District and Buxar District Saran(Chhapra) District. Buxar District Chakki is south of this place and Saran district is east of this place. Bairia is also on the border of Bhojpur District and Saran district. It is near the Bihar State border.

Politics 
 Bharatiya Janata Party
 Samajwadi Party

Polling stations/booths near Bairia:
 Junior High School Talibpur East 
 P.P. Bhopalpur Purvi 
 P.P. Chakia South 
 P.P. Narharipuri West 
 P.P. Shival

Transport

By rail 

Suraimanpur is the nearest railway station to Bairia having road distance of 7 kms with stoppage of majority trains connecting directly from New Delhi, Mumbai, Lucknow, Kanpur etc. 

Ballia and Chhapra Junction are the closest major railway stations having rail distance to Suraimanpur Railway Station of 36 Kms & 25 Kms and road distance of 36 Kms & 30 Kms to Bairia. The road connectivity to Suraimanpur, Ballia and Chhapra is very good. Private transports ply between these places almost round the clock.

References

Cities and towns in Ballia district